Walter Short (1880–1949) was a U.S. Army major general and temporary lieutenant general. General Short may also refer to:

Alonzo Short (born 1939), U.S. Army lieutenant general
Jennifer Short (fl. 1990s–2020s), U.S. Air Force brigadier general
Walter Cowen Short (1870–1952), U.S. Army brigadier general

See also
Arthur Shortt (1899–1984), British Army major general